The Military ranks of Rhodesia were the military insignia used by the Rhodesian Security Forces. Since Rhodesia was a landlocked country, the Security Force did not have a navy. Being a former British colony, Rhodesia shared a rank structure similar to that of the United Kingdom.

Since 1980, they have been replaced by the military ranks of Zimbabwe.

Commissioned officer ranks
The rank insignia of commissioned officers.

Other ranks
The rank insignia of non-commissioned officers and enlisted personnel.

References

External links
 Rhodesian Forces (Army ranks)
 Rhodesian Forces (Air Force ranks)
 

1980 disestablishments in Zimbabwe
Rhodesia
Military of Rhodesia
Zimbabwe and the Commonwealth of Nations